Beta Dumančić (born 26 March 1991) is a Croatian volleyball player. She plays as middle blocker for Romanian club Dinamo București.

International career 
She is a member of the Croatia women's national volleyball team. She competed at the 2021 Women's European Volleyball League, winning a silver medal.

References

External links
 

1991 births
Living people
Croatian women's volleyball players
Sportspeople from Osijek
Expatriate volleyball players in Poland
Expatriate volleyball players in the Czech Republic
Expatriate volleyball players in Germany
Expatriate volleyball players in Italy
Expatriate volleyball players in Romania
Middle blockers
Mediterranean Games medalists in volleyball
Mediterranean Games gold medalists for Croatia
Competitors at the 2018 Mediterranean Games